András Szennay (born József Szennay; 2 June 1921 – 22 August 2012) was a Hungarian prelate of the Roman Catholic Church. He was born in Budapest and ordained a priest on 19 November 1944. Szennay was appointed Abbot nullius and Archabbot of the Pannonhalma Archabbey on 14 March 1973 and remained in this position until resigning in 1991. He died in 2012, aged 91.

References

External links
Profile at Catholic Hierarchy website
Pannonhalma Archabbey (Hungarian)

Hungarian abbots
Benedictine abbots
Clergy from Budapest
20th-century Hungarian Roman Catholic priests
1921 births
2012 deaths
Hungarian Benedictines